Eaton Nunatak is a prominent nunatak marking the southeastern extremity of the Merrick Mountains, in Palmer Land, Antarctica. It was mapped by the United States Geological Survey from surveys and from U.S. Navy air photos, 1961–67, and was named by the Advisory Committee on Antarctic Names for John W. Eaton, an aurora scientist at Eights Station in 1963.

References 

Nunataks of Antarctica